Fernando Sérgio Rigor Silva (born 1 March 1980) is a Portuguese former long-distance runner who competed at distances from 3000 metres to the marathon. He represented his country in the marathon at the 2009 World Championships in Athletics and the 2010 European Athletics Championships. He has also competed at four editions of the World Athletics Cross Country Championships and six editions of the European Cross Country Championships. He shared in a team bronze medal with the Portuguese men at the 2003 European Cross Country Championships. He was twice national champion at the Portuguese Cross Country Championships.

Silva failed a drug test for erythropoietin (EPO), a banned blood-booster, in December 2006, which resulted in his disqualification from the 2006 European Cross Country Championships and a two-year ban. Later he received an 8-year ban from competition in 2014 after failing a doping control based on his biological passport. His ban was backdated to 13 September 2013, with his ban due to expire in 2021.

International competitions

National titles
Portuguese Cross Country Championships
Long course: 2004, 2005

Personal bests
3000 m: 8:04.60 min (2005)
5000 m: 13:54.60 min (2006)
10,000 m: 29:10.18 min (2006)
Half marathon: 1:02:58 (2009)
Marathon: 2:12:09 (2009)
3000 m steeplechase: 8:49.82 min (2002)

See also
List of doping cases in athletics
Portugal at the 2010 European Athletics Championships
Portugal at the 2009 World Championships in Athletics

References

External links
 
 
 

1980 births
Living people
Portuguese male long-distance runners
Portuguese male marathon runners
Portuguese male cross country runners
World Athletics Championships athletes for Portugal
Portuguese sportspeople in doping cases
Doping cases in athletics